Tore Ulf Axel Zetterholm (1915–2001) was a Swedish novelist, playwright and journalist. He made his literary debut in 1940 with the novel Stora Hoparegränd och himmelriket. He chaired the Writers' Guild of Sweden from 1957 to 1972. He was awarded the Dobloug Prize in 1978.

References

1915 births
2001 deaths
Dobloug Prize winners
20th-century Swedish novelists
20th-century Swedish dramatists and playwrights
Swedish male novelists
Swedish male dramatists and playwrights
20th-century Swedish male writers